Trace Adkins is an American country music singer. His discography consists of twelve studio albums and six greatest hits albums. Of his twelve studio albums, six have been certified by the RIAA: 1997's Big Time is certified Gold, as are 2001's Chrome, and 2006's Dangerous Man. His 1996 debut Dreamin' Out Loud and 2003's Comin' On Strong are certified Platinum. 2005's Songs About Me is his best-selling album, certified 2× Platinum by the RIAA. Two of Adkins' compilation albums, Greatest Hits Collection, Vol. 1 and American Man: Greatest Hits Volume II are certified Platinum

Adkins has also released forty singles to country radio, all but seven of which have reached Top 40 on the Billboard country charts. This total includes four Number Ones: "(This Ain't) No Thinkin' Thing" (1997), "Ladies Love Country Boys" (2007), "You're Gonna Miss This" (2008), which is also his highest Billboard Hot 100 peak at number 12, and "Hillbilly Bone" (2009-2010), a duet with Blake Shelton. Ten more of his singles are Top Ten hits on the country charts, including the number 2 "Honky Tonk Badonkadonk" from late 2005-early 2006, which is also his only other Top 40 pop hit at number 30. "You're Gonna Miss This" and 2004's "Rough & Ready" are both gold-certified digital singles, and "Honky Tonk Badonkadonk" is certified platinum as a mastertone.

Studio albums

1990s

2000s

2010s and 2020s

Compilation albums

Extended plays

Singles

1990s

2000s

2010s - 2020s

As a featured artist

Other charted songs

Videography

Music videos

Guest appearances

Notes

References

Country music discographies
Discographies of American artists